Sven Theißen (born 24 October 1988) is a retired German footballer. Since 2015, he works in marketing for VfB Lübeck.

Theißen made his full debut on 22 November 2009 in a 2. Bundesliga match for MSV Duisburg against SpVgg Greuther Fürth.

References

External links 
 Profile at kicker.de
 

1988 births
Living people
Footballers from Duisburg
German footballers
Association football midfielders
MSV Duisburg players
SC Fortuna Köln players
VfB Lübeck players
2. Bundesliga players
Regionalliga players